Nowhere to Run is a 1989 American thriller drama film directed by Carl Franklin (in his feature film directorial debut) and starring David Carradine and Jason Priestley.

Plot
In rural Texas, 1960 — an age of good times and innocence, when growing up was supposed to be easy — six high school seniors know the terrible secret that will make the difference in the biggest election in the county's history. They must make the most difficult decision of their lives. They must become adults.

Cast

 David Carradine as Harmon 
 Jason Priestley as Howard 
 Jillian McWhirter as Cynthia 
 Kieran Mulroney as Jerry Lee 
 Henry Jones as Judge Culbert  
 Matt Adler as Don 
 Brenda Bakke as Joannie 
 Jocelyn Jones as Mrs. Tooley 
 Harry Northup as Rayford Satterwhite 
 Don Steele as Charlie Caddo

References

External links

1989 films
1989 drama films
1989 directorial debut films
Films directed by Carl Franklin
American drama films
Films produced by Julie Corman
Films scored by Barry Goldberg
Films set in 1960
Films set in Texas
1980s English-language films
1980s American films